The 2021–22 PHF season was the seventh season of the Premier Hockey Federation (PHF), which was known as the National Women's Hockey League during the previous six seasons, in North America. After mostly playing in a bubble environment the previous season due to the on-going COVID-19 pandemic, the PHF commenced the 2021–22 season with a normal travel-based schedule.

League business 
Following the 2021 Isobel Cup Finals, Lisa Haley was appointed as the league's vice president of hockey operations.

On April 28, 2021, the league announced that it was planning to double the salary cap of every franchise to $300,000, based on projections of financial stability for the seventh season.

On September 7, 2021, it was announced that the league would be renamed from the National Women's Hockey League (NWHL) to the Premier Hockey Federation (PHF).

On February 23, 2022, the league announced that all teams were allowed to sign one additional player for the remainder of the season and spend an additional $10,000 above the current $300,000 salary cap. Additionally, all clubs would also be allowed to dress 18 skaters per game, up from 17 for the rest of the 2021–22 season.

Expansion 
Plans for an expansion team in Montreal, Quebec, for the seventh season were delayed. Boston Pride president Miles Arnone, a member of the BTM Group, the group behind establishing the expansion club, confirmed the league announcement. With concerns over the on-going COVID-19 pandemic, the earliest season for an expansion team in Montreal would be 2022–23.

Team ownership 
On May 10, the NWHL announced the sale and transfer of ownership of the Connecticut Whale to Shared Hockey Enterprises (SHE), LLC, led by Tobin Kelly. The Whale became the first of the four founding teams to be sold to outside ownership after the league's October 2020 announcement of its transition to joint venture models. The Metropolitan Riveters then were sold to BTM Partners on May 26, giving them control of three of the league's six franchises. A transfer of ownership from W Hockey Partners, the new ownership installed John Boynton to serve as the Riveters' chairman. The NWHL finished selling its league operated teams to independent ownership with the sale of the Buffalo Beauts and Minnesota Whitecaps to a joint partnership of NLTT Ventures, LLC, and Top Tier Sports on June 28, 2021.

Front office changes 

(*) Indicates interim.

Coaching changes

Regular season

Standings 

The regular season schedule was published on August 5, 2021.

Standings as of March 22, 2022.

Schedule

All times listed are Eastern Time.

Playoffs

The Isobel Cup playoffs were held in the Tampa Bay area at AdventHealth Center Ice in Wesley Chapel, Florida. All six teams will compete in the postseason. The preliminary rounds will be played on March 25, with the semifinals on March 27 and the championship game on March 28. The championship game will air live on ESPN2 and TSN2.

Boston vs. Buffalo

Metropolitan vs. Minnesota

Connecticut vs. Minnesota

Boston vs. Toronto

Boston vs. Connecticut

All-Star Game

The 2022 PHF All-Star Game was originally scheduled to take place at the home of the Toronto Six, but was moved to Buffalo, home of the Beauts, due to COVID-19 restrictions in Ontario.  At the same time as the relocation announcement, it was announced that the 2023 All-Star Game would be held in Toronto.

Draft
The 2021 NWHL Draft resulted in Taylor Girard being selected first overall by the Connecticut Whale.

References

External links 
 League website

2021–22 PHF season
PHF season, 2021-22
PHF season, 2021-22
2021-22 PHF season
2021-22 PHF season
PHF season, 2021-22